Amy Dommel-Diény (1894–1981) was a French musicologist and composer. She was a professor of harmony and counterpoint at the Schola Cantorum de Paris and at the Conservatoire de Strasbourg. She is the author of many books on music and music composition. In 1948, she published Le Cœur en Fête, a collection of popular songs, psalms and hymns. In 1973, she published a new version of Gabriel Fauré's sonata for piano and violin. She also had correspondence with Charles Koechlin and Gabriel Marcel.

Bibliography 
1919: Chansons et contes, preface by Vincent d'Indy
1939: L'Histoire de mes poupées, four-handed suite for children, Paris
1951: Trois Improvisations, Paris, Leduc
1957: 300 leçons d'harmonie et exercices gradués, Neuchâtel, Delachaux et Niestlé
1960: Contrepoint et harmonie, Neuchâtel, Delachaux et Niestlé.
1960: L'Harmonie vivante, Paris, Delachaux et Niestlé, 1960.
1974: Abrégé d'harmonie tonale
1977: Étude sur la Première Sonate pour clavecin et flûte en si mineur de Bach, Sceaux
1980: De l'analyse harmonique à l'interprétation, Paris
1981: L'Écriture musicale tonale, Paris
1984: Il Capello, Lyon

References

External links 
 Amy Dommel-Diény La revue du conservatoire
 Amy Dommel-Dieny on Playing the Organ Works of César Franck

1894 births
1981 deaths
20th-century French musicologists
Women musicologists
French composers
20th-century French women musicians